Warszawa Toruńska railway station is a railway station in the Białołęka and Targówek districts of Warsaw, Poland. As of 2012, it is used by Koleje Mazowieckie, who run the KM9 services from Warszawa Wola or Warszawa Zachodnia through the north of the Masovian Voivodeship to Działdowo, in the Warmian-Masurian Voivodeship via Legionowo, Nasielsk, Modlin, Ciechanów and Mława, at all of which some trains terminate, and by Szybka Kolej Miejska, who run S9 services to Wieliszew, with some trains terminating at Legionowo or Legionowo Piaski.

References
 Station article at kolej.one.pl

External links
 

Torunska
Railway stations served by Koleje Mazowieckie
Railway stations served by Szybka Kolej Miejska (Warsaw)
Białołęka
Targówek